Foster Hedley (6 January 1908 – 1983) was an English professional footballer who played for St Andrews (Newcastle), South Shields, Corinthians (Newcastle), Jarrow, Hull City, Nelson, Manchester City, Chester, Tottenham Hotspur, Millwall and Swindon Town.

Football career 
Hedley played for St Andrews (Newcastle), South Shields, Corinthians (Newcastle) and Jarrow before joining Hull City where he participated in two matches in 1928. After spells with Nelson and Manchester City the outside left signed for Chester in 1931 where he went on to feature in 88 games and scoring on 29 occasions. Hedley joined Tottenham Hotspur to play a further five matches and netting once in all competitions. After leaving White Hart Lane he joined Millwall before ending his playing career at Swindon Town where he played 30 matches and scored seven goals in all competitions between 1938–46.

References

External links 
Chester City F.C. first Football League match

1908 births
1983 deaths
People from Whitley Bay
Footballers from Tyne and Wear
English footballers
English Football League players
South Shields F.C. (1889) players
Hull City A.F.C. players
Nelson F.C. players
Manchester City F.C. players
Chester City F.C. players
Tottenham Hotspur F.C. players
Millwall F.C. players
Swindon Town F.C. players
Jarrow F.C. players
Association football outside forwards